The Macedonian Struggle was a series of social, political, cultural and military conflicts that were mainly fought between Greek and Bulgarian subjects who lived in Ottoman Macedonia between 1893 and 1912. The conflict was part of a wider rebel war in which revolutionary organizations of Greeks, Bulgarians and Serbs all fought over Macedonia. Gradually the Greek and Bulgarian bands gained the upper hand. Though the conflict was largely pacified by the Young Turk Revolution, it remained a low intensity insurgency until the Balkan Wars.

Background

Initially the conflict was waged through educational and religious means, with a fierce rivalry developing between supporters of the Ecumenical Patriarchate of Constantinople (Greek-speaking or Slavic/Romance-speaking who generally identified as Greek), and supporters of the Bulgarian Exarchate, which had been recognized by the Ottomans in 1870.

As Ottoman rule in the Balkans crumbled in the late 19th century, competition arose between Greeks and Bulgarians (and to a lesser extent also other ethnic groups such as Serbs, Aromanians and Albanians) over the multi-ethnic region of Macedonia. The Bulgarians founded the Internal Macedonian Revolutionary Organization in 1893 which coordinated the majority of Bulgarian actions in the region. The defeat of Greece in the Greco-Turkish War of 1897 was a loss that appalled Greeks which led to the dissolution of the Ethniki Eteria, by Prime Minister Georgios Theotokis. With little prospect of liberation by Greece, the Macedonian Greeks took their fate into their own hands and began to form various armed bands that would ultimately fall under the control of the Hellenic Macedonian Committee. The region quickly became a constant battleground among various armed groups, with hostilities peaking in 1904-1908. The Ottoman Army was also involved in the conflict and perpetuated atrocities against the Christian population in attempt to quell the unrest. Due to the Christian population of Macedonia, whether Greek, Serb, Bulgarian or Aromanian, engaging in more or less constant rebellion against the Ottoman Empire, in conjunction with the revolutionary activities of Armenian nationalists in Anatolia, many Ottoman officers believed that the all Christians of the empire were disloyal and treasonous.

Internal Macedonian Revolutionary Organization

In 1893, the Bulgarian Internal Macedonian Revolutionary Organization (IMRO) had been founded in Thessaloniki. It self-identified as being representative of all nations in Macedonia, along with anti-Ottoman revolutionaries, with the aim of freeing Macedonia and Thrace from Ottoman rule, potentially to unite with Bulgaria. The IMRO was declared as a Macedonian organization open to all ethnic groups in Macedonia and, earlier on, IMRO claimed that it was fighting for the autonomy of Macedonia and not for annexation to Bulgaria. However, according to some authors and historians, it later became an agent serving Bulgarian interests in Balkan politics with the aim of eventually uniting the entirety of Macedonia with Bulgaria, first in struggles against the Ottoman Empire and later against the Serbian-led Yugoslav successor state controlling the territory of Vardar Macedonia and the Greek state which controlled the southern portion of the region. One major event representing the culmination of these actions is the assassination of the Serbian King of the Kingdom of Serbs, Croats and Slovenes during the inter-war period by an IMRO sniper, likely working for Bulgarian interests. In practice, most of the followers of the IMRO were local Macedonian Bulgarians, though they also had some Aromanian allies or pro-Bulgarian supporters, like Pitu Guli, Mitre The Vlach, Ioryi Mucitano and Alexandar Coshca. Many of the members of the organization saw Macedonian autonomy as an intermediate step to unification with Bulgaria, but others saw as their aim the creation of a Balkan federal state, with Macedonia as an equal member. The IMRO ultimately weakened due to a split into a left-wing faction (federalist) and a right-wing faction (centralists) following the failed Ilinden–Preobrazhenie Uprising.

Bulgarian Activity 
Already from 1895 the Supreme Macedonian-Adrianople Committees were formed in Sofia in order to reinforce the Bulgarian actions in Ottoman Empire. One of Komitadjis' first activities was the capture of the predominantly Greek town of Meleniko (today Melnik, Bulgaria), but they couldn't hold it for more than a few hours. Bulgarian bands destroyed the Pomak village of Dospat where they massacred local inhabitants. This kind of activity alerted Greeks and Serbians, who made a farce of the slogan "Macedonia to Macedonians", being against the constitution of Macedonia as separate state.

As Bulgarian efforts intensified, they started to affect European public opinion. In April 1903, a group known as the Boatmen of Thessaloniki, with assistance from the IMRO, blew up the French ship Guadalquivir and the Ottoman Bank in Thessaloniki. In August 1903, the IMRO organised the Ilinden Uprising in Macedonia and the Adrianople Vilayet which led to the formation of the short-lived Kruševo Republic. The uprising was ultimately suppressed by the Ottoman Army with the subsequent destruction of many villages and the devastation of large areas in Western Macedonia and around Kırk Kilise near Adrianople.

Hellenic Macedonian Committee

In order to strengthen Greek efforts for Macedonia, the Hellenic Macedonian Committee was founded in 1903 by Stefanos Dragoumis and functioned under the leadership of wealthy publisher Dimitrios Kalapothakis. Its members included many Greek notables in addition to the fighters. Among its members were Ion Dragoumis and Pavlos Melas. Its fighters were known as Makedonomachoi ("Macedonian fighters").

Under these conditions, in 1904 a vicious guerrilla war broke as response of IMRO activities between Bulgarian and Greek bands within Ottoman Macedonia. The Bishop of Kastoria, Germanos Karavangelis, who was sent to Macedonia by Nikolaos Mavrokordatos, the ambassador of Greece, and Ion Dragoumis, the consul of Greece in Monastir, realised that it was time to act in a more efficient way and began to organise the intensification of the Greek opposition.

While Dragoumis concerned himself with the financial organisation of the efforts, the central figure in the military struggle was the very capable Cretan officer Georgios Katechakis. Bishop Germanos Karavangelis travelled to raise morale and encourage the Greek population to take action against the IMRO. Many committees were also formed to promote the Greek national interests.

Katechakis and Karavangelis succeeded in the recruitment and organization of guerrilla groups that were later reinforced with volunteers from Greece. Volunteers often came from Crete and the Mani area of the Peloponnese. They even recruited former IMRO members, taking advantage of their political and/or personal disputes within the organisation. Additionally, officers of the Hellenic Army were encouraged to join the struggle to provide experienced leadership as many had served in the Greco-Turkish War of 1897. Many of which would ultimately join and provided a logistical advantage to the Makedonomachoi. The Macedonian Greeks, however, would form the core of the fighting force and proved to be the most important fighters due to their knowledge of the region's geography and some possessing knowledge of the Bulgarian language. Many Macedonian Greeks, such as Periklis Drakos, were also involved in the smuggling and stashing of weapons and ammunition around the region.

Greek activity

The Greek state became concerned, not only because of Bulgarian penetration in Macedonia but also due to Serbian interests, which were concentrated mainly in Üsküp and Monastir area. The rioting in Macedonia, especially the death of Pavlos Melas in 1904, caused intense nationalistic feelings in Greece. This led to the decision to send more volunteers to reinforce and better organise the armed bands and thwart the Bulgarian efforts to bring all of the Slavic-speakers of Macedonia on under their influence.

The Greek General Consulate in Thessaloniki, under Lambros Koromilas, became the centre of the struggle, coordinating the Greek bands, distributing , and nursing the wounded. Fierce conflicts between the Greeks and Bulgarians started in the area of Kastoria, in the Giannitsa Lake area, and elsewhere. During 1905, guerilla activity increased and the Makedonomachoi gained significant advantage within 10 months, extending their control towards the areas of Mariovo and East Macedonia, Kastanohoria (near Kastoria), the plains north and south of Florina and the routes around Monastir. However, from early 1906 the situation became critical and the forces of the Makedonomachoi were forced to withdraw from various areas. Nevertheless, the groups of Tellos Agras and Ioannis Demestichas had some success in the marsh of Giannitsa. There were great advances of the Serb forces, joined by Muslim Slavs, in summer of 1906 in the northern areas of the Sanjak of Üsküp.

While the armed bands confronted the Ottoman Army, the Ottoman administration often ignored the activities of the Greek guerrillas, and according to Dakin assisted them against the Bulgarians outright. However, once the subversive potential of the Bulgarians had been neutralised, Ottoman policy ended the favourable neutrality to the Greek side and embarked upon relentless persecutions against the Greeks. During the course of the war Greek armed bands numbered 2,000 men. Of whom over 700 were killed in action along with 1,250 pro-Greek civilians.

Aromanian activity
The Greek–Romanian conflict concerning the Aromanians reached its climax during the Macedonian Struggle, with Aromanians being no longer divided into pro-Greek and pro-Romanian factions but into "Greeks" and "Romanians" proper. The pro-Greek faction was almost universally and inevitably the larger and most powerful.

Pro-Greek Aromanians 
Most Aromanians during the Macedonian Struggle were pro-Greek, supporting the Greek revolutionaries and the Ecumenical Patriarchate of Constantinople. These Aromanians escaped or resisted the influence of Romanian interventionism, in which a considerable amount of money was spent on by the Romanian state. They were indifferent or even hostile to their national movement. In the archives of the Greek Foreign Ministry there are numerous testimonies from Aromanian communities denouncing Romanian "propaganda" and proclaiming their Greekness.

In Veria, there was a small local unit which was under the leadership of a pro-Greek Aromanian, Tasos Koukotegos. This unit, being small and somewhat isolated, had been operating without definite objectives, but it proved to be very important for the Greek cause as it helped in fights against local Turkish chiefs, pro-Romanian Aromanians, and Bulgarian komitadjis. Additionally, local support from pro-Greek Aromanians in Kastoria empowered Greek activity in the region. A notable Greek makedonomachos of Aromanian descent was Anastasios Pichion.

In Pelagonia, the pro-Greek sentiments of Aromanians during the Macedonian Struggle contributed to their displacement. When they migrated to Greece, they were already financially ruined.

Pro-Romanian Aromanians 
As the Bulgarians had managed to introduce their language in church services and education in the Ottoman Empire, so did the pro-Romanian Aromanians start demanding the same rights. The Greek Ecumenical Patriarch of Constantinople reacted strongly to this however amid increased rivalry in the region and eight Aromanian churches were closed by his personal order in 1875. This produced protests from the pro-Romanian Aromanians to the Ottoman and Romanian government, and also increased tensions between the pro-Romanian Aromanians and the Greeks as well as with pro-Greek Aromanians, which led to physical violence that often ended in fatalities.

In 1903, following the failure of the Ilinden–Preobrazhenie Uprising in which many pro-Romanian Aromanian and Bulgarian soldiers had fought with the aim of creating a Macedonian autonomy, the Ottoman Empire allowed the intervention of Greek militias, known as antartes and formed within Greece with commanders from the Greek state, to suppress potential renewed attempts of this objective. These commanders began to threaten the leaders of various Romanian schools in Aromanian villages, warning them that if they did not close down their activities, they would be attacked. These pro-Romanian Aromanian bands were allied with Bulgarian bands in Ottoman Macedonia. In 1906, under Gheorghe Mucitani, they were organized into two committees, one in Bucharest led by Alex Coșca and Sterie Milioru and the other in Sofia led by Mucitani. He decided to divide their area of ​​operations into districts led by a so-called voivode. These bands were allowed free passage by Bulgarian villages.

Clashes 
Starting from summer of 1904, clashes between pro-Romanian Aromanian and ethnic Greek or pro-Greek Aromanian bands, be it only between themselves or with other combatants involved, erupted in the village of Condusula (between Edessa and Naousa), Ano Grammatiko, Pyrgoi and Dervent. Pro-Greek schools and churches were destroyed by the pro-Romanian Aromanians and pro-Greek Aromanians retaliated by doing the same to pro-Romanian schools and churches. The two factions expelled each other and even murdered opponent schoolteachers and clergy.

Greeks and pro-Greek Aromanians suffered attacks from Turkish troops and bashibazouks who killed 41 of them and destroyed 366 and 203 of their houses and shops respectively.

Crimes
War crimes were committed by both sides during the Macedonian struggle. According to a 1900 British report compiled by Alfred Biliotti, who is considered to have heavily relied on Greek intelligence agents, starting from 1897, the members of the Exarchist committees had embarked upon a systematic and extensive campaign of executions of the leading members of the Greek side. Moreover, Bulgarian Komitadjis, pursued a campaign of extermination of Greek and Serbian teachers and clergy. On the other hand, there were attacks by Greek Andartes on many Macedonian Bulgarian villages, with the aim of forcing their inhabitants to switch their allegiance from the Exarchate back to the Patriarchate and accept Greek priest and teachers, but they also carried out massacres against the civilian population, especially in the central parts of Macedonia in 1905 and in 1906. One of the notable cases was the massacre at the village Zagorichani (today Vasiliada, Greece), which was a Bulgarian Exarchist stronghold near Kastoria on 25 March 1905, where between 60 and 78 villagers were killed by Greek bands.

According to British reports on political crimes (including the above-mentioned Biliotti report), during the period from 1897 to 1912 over 4000 political murders were committed (66 before 1901, 200 between 1901 and 1903, 3300 between 1903 and 1908 and 600 between 1908 and 1912), excluding those killed during the Ilinden Uprising and the members of the Bulgarian and Greek bands. Of those who were killed, 53% were Bulgarians, 33.5% were Greeks, Serbs and Aromanians together 3.5% and 10% were of unknown nationality.

These conflicts decreased their intensity after the revolution of Young Turks in July 1908, as they promised to respect all ethnicities and religions, and to provide a constitution.

Consequences

The success of Greek efforts in Macedonia was an experience that gave confidence to the country. It helped develop an intention to annex Greek-speaking areas, and bolster Greek presence in the still Ottoman-ruled Macedonia.
	
The events in Macedonia, specifically the consequences of the conflicts between Greek and Bulgarian national activists, including Greek massacres against the Bulgarian population in 1905 and 1906, gave rise to pogroms against the ca. 70,000-80,000 strong Greek communities that lived in Bulgaria, who were considered to share responsibility for the actions of the Greek guerrilla groups.

Nevertheless, the Young Turk movement resulted in a few instances of collaboration between Greek and Bulgarian bands, while this time the official policy in both countries continue to support the penetration of armed fighters into Ottoman Macedonia, but without having fully ensured that there would be no attacks on each other.

Legacy

The Greek fighters were portrayed by Greek writer Penelope Delta in her novel Τά μυστικά τοῦ Βάλτου (Ta Mystiká tou Váltou – The Secrets of the Swamp), as well as in the book of memoirs Ὁ Μακεδονικός Ἀγών (The Macedonian Struggle) by Germanos Karavangelis, while on the other side, the IMRO and their activities are depicted in the book Confessions of a Macedonian Bandit: A Californian in the Balkan Wars, written by Albert Sonnichsen, an American volunteer in the IMRO during the Macedonian Struggle.

See also
Macedonian Question
List of Macedonian Revolutions

Notes

References

 
 
 
 Dakin, Douglas: "The Greek Struggle in Macedonia 1897–1913", 1993 
 Karavangelis, Germanos: "The Macedonian Struggle" (Memoirs)* Koliopoulos, Ioannis: History of Greece from 1800, Nation, State and Society, Thessaloniki, 2000 
 
 Rappoport, Alfred: Au pays des martyrs. Notes et souvenirs d'un ancien consul-général d'Autriche-Hongrie en Macédoine (1904–1909). Librarie Universitaire J. Gamber, Paris, 1927. Memoirs of the General Consul of Austro-Hungary in Macedonia. Cat. No. 7029530203814.
 
 Sonnichsen, Albert: Confessions of a Macedonian Bandit: A Californian in the Balkan Wars, The Narrative Press,  (the Macedonian struggle from a perspective of an American volunteer in IMRO)
 Vakalopoulos, Apostolos: "History of the Greek Nation 1204–1985" (in Greek language)

 
Macedonia under the Ottoman Empire
Kosovo vilayet
Manastir vilayet
Salonica vilayet
Wars involving the Ottoman Empire
Wars involving Bulgaria
Wars involving Serbia
Wars involving Greece
Conflicts in 1901
Conflicts in 1902
Conflicts in 1903
Conflicts in 1904
Conflicts in 1905
Conflicts in 1906
Conflicts in 1907
Conflicts in 1908
1893 in the Ottoman Empire
1904 in the Ottoman Empire
1905 in the Ottoman Empire
1906 in the Ottoman Empire
1907 in the Ottoman Empire
1908 in the Ottoman Empire
Greece–Ottoman Empire relations
Bulgaria–Ottoman Empire relations
Ottoman Empire–Serbia relations
Bulgaria–Greece relations
Greece–Serbia relations
Greece–Romania relations
Bulgaria–Romania relations
Ottoman Empire–Romania relations
Mass murder in 1901
Mass murder in 1903
Mass murder in 1904
Mass murder in 1905
Mass murder in 1906
History of the Aromanians
History of the Megleno-Romanians
Politics of the Aromanians